Kate Lynn Nauta (born April 29, 1982) is an American fashion model, actress and singer. One of her major roles in feature films was Lola in Transporter 2. She previously also used the name Katie professionally.

Biography
Nauta was born in Salem, Oregon, and grew up in Woodburn, Oregon, where she lived until 2000. She graduated from Woodburn High School in 2000. She started modeling at age 15. At 17 she was a winner of the U.S. Elite Model Look contest and went on to compete in the finals in Nice, France in 1999. She is now managed by Mode Models International. She has modelled for Versace (Sport and Versus), L'Oréal, DKNY, and Abercrombie & Fitch as well as doing advertisements for, among others, Motorola.

Luc Besson cast Nauta as 'Lola' in Transporter 2 and also used two of her songs on its soundtrack. She stars also in the web series Fear Clinic.

Nauta also sings and writes lyrics. She has worked on her music with Lenny Kravitz. Her song "Revolution" is on the soundtrack of Transporter 2. Also, she is featured in the song "Name Game (Remember)" by hip-hop/rap group Naughty by Nature.

Currently she also designs houses with her husband Robert.

Filmography

References

External links
 
 

1982 births
American female models
American film actresses
Living people
Actresses from Salem, Oregon
Musicians from Salem, Oregon
People from Woodburn, Oregon
American people of Dutch descent
Singers from Oregon
Female models from Oregon
21st-century American singers
21st-century American women singers